The Athletic League of New England State Colleges (ALNESC) was one of the earliest college athletics conferences in the United States, with its membership centered in the northeast United States.

Membership

 Massachusetts Agricultural College (now University of Massachusetts Amherst)
 Storrs Agricultural College (now University of Connecticut)
 Rhode Island College of Agriculture and the Mechanic Arts  (now University of Rhode Island)

See also
 List of defunct college football conferences

References

 
Sports leagues established in 1896
Sports leagues disestablished in 1923
Defunct college sports conferences in the United States